Offer Shlomi (born April 25, 1964), better known as Vince Offer or Vince Shlomi, is an Israeli-American infomercial pitchman, director, writer, and comedian. Offer's first major work was the 1999 comedy film The Underground Comedy Movie. Offer owns, produces, and appears in television commercials for his products "ShamWow!", an absorbent towel; the "Slap Chop", a kitchen utensil; a lint roller called the "Schticky"; a liquid cleaner called "InVinceable"; and another kitchen utensil called "Crank Chop". He has also officially advertised other products that he does not own, such as Quicky Grass.

Early life
Offer Shlomi was born in Beersheva, Israel and grew up in Sheepshead Bay, Brooklyn, New York. As a child, he was fascinated by Crazy Eddie commercials. Offer would shovel his neighbors’ driveways as a teen, working until the night. He dropped out of high school when he was 17 and moved to Los Angeles, changing his name to Vince Offer.

Career

Film
In 1999, Offer directed and appeared in The Underground Comedy Movie, which was met with extremely negative reviews. DVDs of the film were marketed via television infomercial. The film also led to several lawsuits. Although the film was released and screened in 1999, Offer was bankrupt by 2002 and home video distribution plans were shelved. Offer, who had previously been a successful vegetable chopper salesman and businessman, resumed selling vegetable choppers at swap meets to support himself and raise money to complete his film project. Within a few months, he had earned enough to resume production, and the movie was finally completed, released, and marketed entirely on late-night infomercials that Offer paid for with his earnings from the swap meet vegetable chopper sales. The film has sold in excess of 100,000 copies and Offer has used the proceeds from sales to file a lawsuit against the Church of Scientology. He is an ex-Scientologist.

In 2011, he appeared as himself in the Adam Sandler film Jack and Jill. Title character Jill, played by Sandler, referred to him as "the ShamWow guy".

In 2013, Offer released the universally panned InAPPropriate Comedy, which he directed, wrote and appears in as a character called 'Peeping Tom'.  The film was originally envisioned as a sequel to Underground Comedy Movie. The film features stars Rob Schneider, Michelle Rodriguez, Adrien Brody, and Lindsay Lohan. Examples of film sketches include comedian Ari Shaffir as 'The Amazing Racist', with deliberately offensive hidden-camera encounters with members of different minority groups, and Brody as 'Flirty Harry', a Dirty Harry spoof.

Infomercial marketing

Background
Offer funded The Underground Comedy Movie with his own money, but had difficulty selling it. He put the trailer in an infomercial, and claims to have sold 50,000 copies via direct order and 50,000 more in stores. In 2010, he advertised Eminem's Recovery album. In 2020, Eminem celebrated the 10th anniversary of his album, Recovery, by introducing merchandise and sharing the original commercial starring Offer.

ShamWow
In 2006, Offer began to market a cleaning product that he saw in flea markets, an absorbent towel that he called the "ShamWow!" The title of the product derives from the French pronunciation of the chamois, pronounced "shammy" in English. Offer visited the factory in Germany where the product is made, and he decided to incorporate that fact into the TV pitch.

The advertisement, filmed in the summer of 2007 with a budget of $20,000, received critical praise. Slates Seth Stevenson praised Offer for his "impressive and subtle mastery of the pitchman's art" (with lines such as "you know the Germans always make good stuff"), and wondered if Offer's "abrasive manner might also mark a unique, new strategy in the annals of pitchdom." Stevenson compared Offer to earlier, "more upbeat" television pitchmen like Billy Mays and the Home Shopping Network hosts and concluded that Offer's "smooth-talking condescension" was more suited to the present "zeitgeist" than the "earnest fervor" of spokesmen like Mays and Ron Popeil.

Consumer Reports reported that the infomercial for "ShamWow!" initially featured Offer claiming that the product held "20 times its weight in liquid". Later, the infomercial was changed to Offer claiming the "ShamWow!" held "12 times its weight in liquid", then again to "10 times". Consumer Reports did its own test on the product and found that it does indeed hold 10 times its weight in liquid but no more.

Offer says that he has sold millions of the towels. In contrast to claims that the absorbency of the towels is over-hyped, he responds that returns of the product are low.

Pitchman Billy Mays had been promoting a similar product called Zorbeez two years prior to Offer's "ShamWow!" product. Mays noted that the "ShamWow!" commercials use many of the same product demonstrations as the earlier-produced Zorbeez commercial. Popular Mechanics tested the absorbency of the two towel products and declared "ShamWow!" was the more effective of the two, but noted "If you have reusable cloth rags (and a roll of paper towels for backup), then neither product is necessary." During the episode, it was suggested that the Popular Mechanics tester did not use the Zorbeez correctly.

Following the popularity of the commercial, TMZ in 2009 posted a remix of the commercial on their site. The remix was originally created by DJ Steve Porter and uploaded on YouTube.

In 2020, Offer started to sell "ShamWow!" masks due to the COVID-19 pandemic. He appeared in an infomercial showing the cloths, followed by wearing the face mask, which are made up of viscose/polypropylene thermally bonded non-woven cloth, and then giving a thumbs up.

Slap Chop
In December 2008, Offer, who had previously sold kitchen utensils at swap meets, appeared in another kitchen gadget infomercial, advertising the Slap Chop and the Graty. The Slap Chop is a hand-held chopping device with internal blades; to operate it, the user places it over a food item and slaps down the button on the top. The Graty is a cheese grater operated by placing the cheese inside and then turning the outside housing of the utensil which causes the cheese to be grated. Offer's aggressiveness and use of double entendres like "you're gonna love my nuts" have been noted by AdWeek, and, according to an Adweek blog, helped make Offer "the man who could beat Billy Mays at his own game."

Mays had been promoting a similar product set which included the Quick Chop utensil and the Quick Grater utensil prior to Offer's Slap Chop/Graty product set. Mays again noted that the Slap Chop commercials use many of the same demos as the earlier-produced Quick Chop commercial. Mays said in the same Adam Carolla radio show interview in February 2009 that Offer stole not only the Zorbeez product idea, but also the Quick Chop idea.

In April 2009, DJ Steve Porter posted an electro-themed "Slap Chop Rap" Auto Tune remix which grew a cult following during July 2009.

An excerpt from a televised Slap Chop commercial featuring Offer is briefly on screen during the 2013 blockbuster Marvel superhero movie Iron Man 3.

In April 2019, DJ Steve Porter posted a 10-year anniversary video of the original electro-themed "Slap Chop Rap" Auto Tune remix.

Schticky
In 2012, Offer returned to television selling the "Schticky", a reusable lint roller that comes in three sizes: little Schticky, Schticky, and big Schticky.

The commercial makes many references to his other two commercials for the ShamWow and the Slap Chop, with Offer saying many of his catchphrases. He also pokes fun at his 2009 arrest by posing for a fake mugshot.

An excerpt from the Schticky commercial can be seen in the TV show Breaking Bad during season 5, episode 7's "Say My Name".

The Schticky commercial was co-written by the comedian Dante.

Canada Green
In April 2014, Offer appeared in a Canada Green commercial advertising their "Quicky Grass" product.

Crank Chop
In December 2015, Offer appeared in a Crank Chop infomercial demonstrating the abilities of the product that slices and dices food with the pull of a nylon cord.

Legal issues

Lawsuits
The Underground Comedy Movie was the subject of a lawsuit filed on September 23, 1998, by Offer against 20th Century Fox and Bobby and Peter Farrelly, the co-directors of There's Something About Mary. Offer claimed that 14 scenes from Mary were lifted for his film.  The case was dismissed in 2000, with the judge ordering Offer to pay over $66,000 in attorneys' fees.

In 2004, Offer sent out a press release through prnewsonline.com announcing his intention to sue the Church of Scientology. In 1997, while production on The Underground Comedy Movie was in progress, the Church of Scientology had allegedly begun a large-scale smear campaign against Offer and his film (Offer was a Scientologist at the time). The director claimed the Scientologists' "Celebrity Center" in Hollywood threatened his Scientology friends in the movie business if they did not write malicious reports against Offer.

In 2011, he was sued by his former personal assistant Jennifer Kosinski, who alleged that he stalked and emotionally abused her, forced her to be with him at all times, groped her, and offered her $20,000 for her to vacation with her family in exchange for her eggs.

Arrest
On February 7, 2009, Offer and a 26-year-old prostitute were both arrested in Miami Beach, Florida, after a physical altercation. The police report stated that the woman had bitten onto Offer's tongue and refused to let go, at which point Offer began beating her and left her with lacerations and fractures. Police later released photos of the bloodied Offer, hotel room, and the battered woman. Prosecutors later declined to file formal charges against either person. When Offer later spoke of the arrest, he stated, "It probably saved my life."

Personal life
Vince Offer married Melody Claire Mandate on April 18, 2014. He has one daughter with her. Mandate filed for divorce on October 18, 2018.

References

External links

 
 Official ShamWow! website
 Official Slap Chop website
 Official Schticky website
 Official Vince Offer YouTube channel

21st-century American businesspeople
American male comedians
21st-century American comedians
American male screenwriters
American former Scientologists
Infomercials
Internet memes
Israeli emigrants to the United States
People from Miami-Dade County, Florida
American salespeople
1964 births
Living people
People from Haifa
Israeli businesspeople
Israeli male comedians
Israeli Jews
Israeli male screenwriters
Israeli television personalities
Writers from Beersheba
Jewish American male comedians
Television personalities from Florida
Comedians from New York City
Actors from Beersheba